Beaver Lake is a lake in South Dakota, in the United States.

Beaver Lake was once teeming with beavers, hence the name.

See also
List of lakes in South Dakota

References

Lakes of South Dakota
Bodies of water of Yankton County, South Dakota